Yu Fei is the atonal pinyin romanization of various Chinese names.

It may refer to:

 Yu Fei, a politician in Guangdong
 Yu Fei (rower), Chinese rower
 Fei Yu